Frank Leverett (March 10, 1859 – November 15, 1943) was an American geologist who specialised in glaciology.

Biography
Frank Leverett was born on March 10, 1859, in Denmark, Iowa, and was descended from a family that emigrated from Boston, Lincolnshire in 1663. Following an education in Denmark Academy from which he expected to become a farmer, Leverett taught in public schools for a year in 1878 before becoming an instructor in natural sciences at the academy for the following three years. Here he became interested in geology and so enrolled in Colorado College and subsequently Iowa State College of Agriculture and Mechanic Arts to study mineralogy and assaying, graduating with a bachelor of science from the latter in 1885. He then began work in a temporary job in Madison, Wisconsin, working with the United States Geological Survey. Leverett continued as an assistant until 1890 when he was given the position of assistant geologist, before becoming a geologist in 1901 and a senior geologist in 1928, until his retirement in 1929. Between 1909 and 1929 Leverett was a lecturer in glacial geology at the University of Michigan, the institution which awarded him an honorary degree of doctor of science in 1930.

Leverett was one of the leading authorities on Pleistocene glaciation and authored over 180 reports and papers. He was elected a fellow of both the Geological Society of America and the American Association for the Advancement of Science, becoming Vice President of the latter in 1928.

Leverett married Frances Gibson on December 22, 1887, and later married Dorothy Park on December 18, 1895, after Gibson's death. He did not have children by either marriage. Leverett died on November 15, 1943, after a brief illness at his home in Ann Arbor, Michigan. A fortnight before his death a bust of Leverett was constructed by the sculptor Carleton Angell.

The Leverett Glacier in Antarctica, Leverett Glacier in Greenland, Lake Leverett in Washington (since drained), and plant species Sigillaria leveretti were named after Frank Leverett.

Professional writings
 The Illinois Ice Lobe; Frank Leverett; U.S. Geological Survey, Monograph, #38; Government Printing Office; Washington, D.C.; 1899
 Glacial formations and drainage features of the Erie and Ohio basins, Frank Leverett; U.S. Geol. Survey, Mon. 41, 802 pages, 25 p1s., 8 figs.;1902
 Surface Geology of the Northern Peninsula of Michigan; Frank Leverett; Michigan Geological and Biological Survey, Publication 7. Geological Series 5.; Lansing, Michigan: 1910
 Surface Geology and Agricultural Conditions of the Southern Peninsula of Michigan; Frank Leverett; Michigan Geological and Biological Survey, Publication 9. Geological Series 7.; Lansing, Michigan: 1911
 The Pleistocene of Indiana and Michigan and the History of the Great Lakes, Monograph 53; Frank Leverett & Frank B. Taylor, U.S. Geological Survey; Government Printing Office, Washington; 1915
 Moraines and shore lines of the Lake Superior region; Frank Leverett; U.S. Geological Survey Prof. Papers 154-A; p. 19, Pl.1; Government Printing Office; Washington, D.C.; 1929
 Relative length of Pleistocene glacial and interglacial stages; Frank Leverett; Science, vol. 72; pp. 193–195; 1930
 The place of the Iowan drive; Frank Leverett; Journal of Geology, Vol. 47; pp 398–407; pp. 400–402; 1939
 Note by Frank Leverett; Frank Leverett; Journal of Geology, vol. 50; pp. 1001–1002; 1942

References

External links
Field Notes of Frank Leverett

American geologists
1859 births
1943 deaths
People from Lee County, Iowa
People from Ann Arbor, Michigan
Colorado College alumni
Iowa State University alumni
University of Michigan staff
United States Geological Survey personnel